FogBugz is an integrated web-based project management system  featuring bug and issue tracking, discussion forums, wikis, customer relationship management, and evidence-based scheduling originally developed by Fog Creek Software.

History
FogBugz was re-branded as Manuscript at the end of 2017.

On August 3, 2018 Manuscript was acquired by DevFactory. They renamed it back to FogBugz.

References

External links
 

Project management software
Bug and issue tracking software
2000 software